Harry and the Butler is a 1961 Danish film directed by Bent Christensen. It was nominated for the Academy Award for Best Foreign Language Film. It was also entered into the 1962 Cannes Film Festival.

Cast 
Osvald Helmuth as Gamle Harry
Ebbe Rode as Fabricius
Gunnar Lauring as Biskoppen
Henning Moritzen as Fyrst Igor
Lise Ringheim as Magdalene
Lily Broberg as Trine, Café Dråbens værtinde
Olaf Ussing as Krause, bilforhandler
Palle Kirk as Heisenberg, 8 år
Aage Fønss as Herskabstjener I
Ejner Federspiel as Herskabstjener II
Einar Reim (as Einer Reim) as Mink, overbetjent
Ernst Schou as Advokat Lund
Emil Halberg as Viggo, udsmider
Johannes Krogsgaard as Teaterdirektøren
Valsø Holm as Meyer, grønthandler

See also
 List of submissions to the 34th Academy Awards for Best Foreign Language Film
 List of Danish submissions for the Academy Award for Best Foreign Language Film

References

External links

1961 films
1961 comedy films
1960s Danish-language films
Films directed by Bent Christensen
Danish comedy films
Films set in Copenhagen
Best Danish Film Bodil Award winners